Raikeswood Hospital was a health facility in Gargrave Road, Skipton, North Yorkshire, England. It has been converted for residential use and remains a Grade II listed building.

History
The facility had its origins in the Skipton Union Workhouse which was designed by George Webster and opened in 1840. A new infirmary was added in 1900. It became the Skipton Public Assistance Institution in 1930 and then joined the National Health Service as Raikeswood Hospital in 1948. After services had transferred to Skipton General Hospital in April 1991, Raikeswood Hospital closed and was subsequently converted for residential use as Gainsborough Court.

References

Hospitals established in 1840
1840 establishments in England
Hospital buildings completed in 1840
Hospitals in North Yorkshire
Defunct hospitals in England
Skipton